William Francis "Smoke" Herring (October 31, 1893 – September 10, 1962) was a Major League Baseball pitcher. He pitched in three games for the Brooklyn Tip-Tops of the Federal League in 1915.

Sources

External links

Major League Baseball pitchers
Brooklyn Tip-Tops players
Worcester Busters players
Bridgeport Americans players
Albany Senators players
Baseball players from New York (state)
1893 births
1962 deaths